Harry McQuinn (December 13, 1905–January 1, 1986 ) was an American racecar driver active in the 1930s and 1940s.

Born in Nineveh, Indiana, McQuinn raced in a Bob Wilke/Leader Card-sponsored midget car owned by the Marchese Brothers from Milwaukee. He raced before the AAA named an official national champion.

McQuinn won 1938, 1939, and 1940 track championships at the 124th Field Artillery Armory in Chicago, the 1937 and 1938 Walsh Stadium track championships in St. Louis in 1937 and 1938, the 1938 Riverview track championship in Chicago, and the 1938 track title at the Milwaukee Mile. McQuinn won 61 feature races in 1938, which ranked him second behind Wally Zale. McQuinn raced in 10 Indianapolis 500 races, with career-best seventh-place finishes in 1938 and 1941.

After McQuinn retired, he was appointed the chief steward at Indianapolis, and the head of the champ car division for AAA and USAC. He died in Morgantown, Indiana 19 days past his 80th birthday, before he could attend his induction in the National Midget Auto Racing Hall of Fame later that year.

Indianapolis 500 results

References

1905 births
1986 deaths
Indianapolis 500 drivers
People from Johnson County, Indiana
Racing drivers from Indiana